See You as I Do is the third solo album by Trijntje Oosterhuis and was released on 9 October 2005. During Trijntje's pregnancy she decided not to tour and perform, but use the time at home in her own studio to record an album. The album peaked at #5 in the Dutch album chart  and was certified Gold. Trijntje started her musical career singing for Candy Dulfer's third album Big Girl and on Trijntje's third album, Candy is featured playing the saxophone on three tracks.

This album has been released with the Copy Control protection system in some regions.

Track listing

Charts

Weekly charts

Year-end charts

References

External links
 Official site

2005 albums
Trijntje Oosterhuis albums
EMI Records albums